Sean Patrick Priddle (born 14 December 1965) is an English retired professional football midfielder who played in the Football League for Exeter City, Crewe Alexandra and Brentford.

Career statistics

References

1965 births
English footballers
English Football League players
Association football midfielders
Brentford F.C. players
Living people
Footballers from Hammersmith
Wimbledon F.C. players
Crewe Alexandra F.C. players
Tooting & Mitcham United F.C. players
Exeter City F.C. players
Weymouth F.C. players
St Albans City F.C. players
Sutton United F.C. players
Carshalton Athletic F.C. players
Harrow Borough F.C. players
Southall F.C. players
Isthmian League players
English expatriate sportspeople in New Zealand
English expatriate sportspeople in Sweden
English expatriate footballers
Expatriate association footballers in New Zealand
Expatriate footballers in Sweden
Napier City Rovers FC players